John Zinser is an American game designer who has worked primarily on collectible card games and role-playing games.

Career
In 1992, Jolly Blackburn added John Zinser and David Seay as partners in Alderac Entertainment Group. In 1994, Zinser was working on an original CCG, Legend of the Five Rings, which began as an idea from a conversation between Zinser and Seay discussing the 1980 RPG Bushido. Blackburn left Alderac in 1995 because he felt that Zinser and Seay were looking for success in the CCG industry while he wanted to keep the company fun and small and focus on Knights of the Dinner Table. According to Zinser, he wanted the in debt company to grow at a faster pace than Blackburn was comfortable with. so, a split was agreed upon, with Blackburn leaving with the rights to Knights of the Dinner Table and a few other properties.  In 1996 Five Rings Publishing Group was formed, with Robert Abramowitz as the President of the new company, Ryan Dancey becoming VP of Product Development and Zinser becoming VP of Sales. Zinser was listed as providing advice on Pinnacle Entertainment Group's RPG Deadlands: Hell on Earth (1998).

References

External links
 

Living people
Role-playing game designers
Year of birth missing (living people)